Edge FM 102.1 is a commercial radio station broadcasting from Wangaratta, Victoria, Australia. It is currently owned by Ace Radio & broadcasts an Adult Contemporary (AC) format. It features both locally produced content & nationally syndicated content from both NOVA Entertainment & Grant Broadcasters. There is a repeater at Mount Beauty (93.3FM). In 2017 Edge FM 102.1 (then branded as 102.1 The Edge) came under the ownership of Ace Radio as its parent company North East Broadcasters was acquired by Ace.

References

Radio stations in Victoria
Adult contemporary radio stations in Australia
Radio stations established in 1996